Hueglo dos Santos Neris (born 17 June 1992 in Tucuruí), is a Brazilian footballer who plays as a centre back for Cruzeiro.

He previously played for Paraná. On 27 July 2021, Neris joined Saudi Arabian club Al-Hazem on loan from Al-Wasl.

Honours

Santa Cruz
Taça Chico Science: 2016
Copa do Nordeste: 2016
Campeonato Pernambucano: 2016

References

External links
  Ogol
  Soccerway

1992 births
Living people
Brazilian footballers
Sportspeople from Pará
Brusque Futebol Clube players
Avaí FC players
Clube Atlético Metropolitano players
Santa Cruz Futebol Clube players
Sport Club Internacional players
Sport Club do Recife players
Paraná Clube players
Boavista F.C. players
Al-Wasl F.C. players
Al-Hazem F.C. players
Cruzeiro Esporte Clube players
UAE Pro League players
Saudi Professional League players
Brazilian expatriate footballers
Expatriate footballers in Portugal
Brazilian expatriate sportspeople in Portugal
Expatriate footballers in the United Arab Emirates
Brazilian expatriate sportspeople in the United Arab Emirates
Expatriate footballers in Saudi Arabia
Brazilian expatriate sportspeople in Saudi Arabia
Association football defenders